Novy Vasyugan is a rural locality (a selo) in Kargasoksky District of Tomsk Oblast, Russia, located on the Vasyugan River  from Kargasok, the administrative center of the district. Population: 2,265 (2012 est.).

History
It was founded in 1933 as a settlement for convicts and was initially called Mogilny Yar. Until 1959, it served as the administrative center of Vasyugansky District, which was later merged into Kargasoksky District.

References

Rural localities in Tomsk Oblast